At 43.4 metres above sea level, the Stollberg is the fourth highest hill in the district of North Frisia in northern Germany, after the Sandesberg near Ostenfeld (53.3 m), the Uwe Düne in the municipality of Kampen auf Sylt (50.2 m) and the Rantzauhöhe within the Langenberg south of the village of Leck (44.8 m). It is part of the geest ridge that runs westwards and was created as a so-called old moraine during the Saale glaciation and was subsequently shaped during the Weichselian glaciation. From the top of the Stollberg there is a good view over the surrounding area, both near and far. The Stollberg belongs to the municipality of Bordelum and lies immediately next to the B 5 federal road.

In the vicinity of the hill is the Stollberg spring, which was considered holy in earlier times.

In April 2002 the Ministry for the Environment, Nature and Forests in the state of Schleswig-Holstein declared the area as a nature experience site (Naturerlebnisraum).

On the Stollberg is a  transmission tower (standard tower) belonging to Deutsche Telekom.

External links 
Ministry for the Environment, Nature and Forests: The Stollberg Nature Experience Site 

Hills of Schleswig-Holstein